Green Bay Southwest High School is one of four public high schools located in Green Bay, Wisconsin. Southwest High School is located at 1331 Packerland Drive. Its school colors are royal blue and silver, and their mascot is the Trojan.

Academics
Nearly half of Southwest's class of 2011 attended accredited four-year colleges (49%). The school offered 14 Advanced Placement courses in 2007, with 220 AP tests taken in May 2007. Overall, 31% of students participated in AP Exams in 2016. Southwest has partnered with NWTC to provide a number of Technical classes at the High School. Southwest High School was ranked #13 in Wisconsin as the best overall school by Newsweek 2013. The school made the Top 20 four years running. A collaboration with NWTC in 2012 to provide credited courses in STEM (Science, Technology, Engineering, Mathematics) provides students hands on coursework in blueprint reading; welding, and robotics. The music department is a magnet for students from neighboring schools and school districts.

Demographics
The school is 66% white, 9% Hispanic, 8% Native American, 6% black, 5% native American, and 5% of students identify as a part of two or more races.

Athletics
Southwest's athletic teams are known as the Fighting Trojans, and compete in the Fox River Classic Conference. The Trojans have won two Wisconsin Interscholastic Athletic Association state championships, one as part of a co-op girls' hockey team in 2014, and the Division 1 girls' tennis championship in 1997.

The football stadium and track and field area is named Dahlin Family Stadium. It was renovated in 2014 to add synthetic turf. Carl Sunby Gymnasium, named after a former athletic director, has a capacity of 2000 and is often used as a neutral site for WIAA basketball playoff sectionals. Additionally, Southwest has tennis courts, baseball diamonds, and an indoor swimming pool.

Notable alumni
John Anderson (1983), ESPN reporter
Lou Goss, NASCAR driver. 
 Natisha Hiedeman (2015), WNBA player 
 Andre Jacque (1999), member of the Wisconsin State Assembly
 Kahlil McKenzie (attended 2011-2013), NFL and XFL defensive lineman 
 Max Scharping (2014), Cincinnati Bengals offensive lineman

Health care reform meetings

Southwest High School was the site of a visit by former U.S. president Barack Obama on June 11, 2009, who led a town hall meeting about health care reform. At the request of members of the physical education and health staff at the school, he signed a wall in a health classroom.

References

External links
 
 Official website of the Troyettes school dance team

High schools in Green Bay, Wisconsin
Public high schools in Wisconsin